Hard Bargain is the twenty-sixth studio album by American country music singer-songwriter Emmylou Harris, released on April 26, 2011, and recorded at Tragedy/Tragedy, TN. The album is her fourth solo recording for Nonesuch Records.

With 17,000 copies sold in its first week, the album debuted at number three on the U.S. Billboard Top Country Albums, Harris' highest entry since her bluegrass LP Roses in the Snow in 1980. At the same time it debuted at number 18 on the Billboard 200, displacing 1977's Luxury Liner as her most successful solo LP ever on that chart.

Album information
The songs which were to become the "Hard Bargain" album were, according to Emmylou, recorded within four weeks in August 2010. Only three people can be heard on the album, namely Harris herself, producer Jay Joyce, and Giles Reaves.
In December 2010 six video clips were filmed at Laughing House Studios, Nashville, TN, directed by Jack Spencer. These videos, with additional commentary, can be found on the bonus DVD of the album's deluxe release.

The opening number "The Road" is about the late Gram Parsons, her musical mentor who died in 1973 and is the first Harris-penned song to directly focus on his death since "Boulder to Birmingham", a track from her 1975 release Pieces of the Sky.

"My Name Is Emmett Till" tells the story of Emmett Till, an African-American boy who was killed in 1955.

"Darlin' Kate" is a tribute to the late Kate McGarrigle who died of cancer in 2010. Kate, and her sister Anna McGarrigle, collaborated with Harris on numerous occasions since the 1970s.

"New Orleans" makes references to Hurricane Katrina, which ravaged the city in 2005.

Track listing

Personnel
 Emmylou Harris – vocals, acoustic guitar
 Jay Joyce – guitar, bass guitar, keyboards, piano, omnichord, ganjo, mandolin 
 Giles Reaves – drums, keyboards, percussion, piano, organ, vibraphone, marimbula

Charts

References

2011 albums
Emmylou Harris albums
Nonesuch Records albums
Albums produced by Jay Joyce
Country folk albums